Maria Magdalena Merten (in religious life Blandine of the Sacred Heart, 10 July 1883 – 18 May 1918) was a German professed religious from the Ursulines. Merten worked as a teacher from 1902 to 1908 in the secular environment while then serving as a teacher while in the religious life from her profession until 1916 when ill health forced her to stop teaching.

Pope John Paul II beatified her on 1 November 1987.

Life
Maria Magdalena Merten was the ninth of eleven children born to farmers.

Between 1902 and 1908 she taught children in a secular environment but in November 1908 decided to become a member of the Ursulines near Ahrweiler (along with her sister) with the intention of teaching and to deepen her understanding of faith; she commenced her novitiate in 1910. Merten made her solemn profession on 4 November 1913 and assumed the name of "Blandine of the Sacred Heart". Merten led a simple life with an emphasis on tending to the children entrusted to her while also associating action and contemplation with the huge devotion she fostered towards the Eucharist. In September 1916 she contracted tuberculosis and was forced to stop teaching as a result.

Merten died in mid-1918 at the convent of Saint Bantus due to her tuberculosis and she was buried at the Basilica of St Paulinus in Trier. Her remains were later transferred on 18 May 1990.

Beatification
The beatification process opened in Trier in an informative process on 13 November 1954 until its conclusion on 9 June 1962; her writings later received approval on 21 December 1968 while the cause's formal introduction came on 4 December 1980 in which she was titled as a Servant of God. Theologians would later approve the Positio of the cause on 26 January 1983 while the Congregation for the Causes of Saints also approved it on 12 April 1983.

Pope John Paul II named her as Venerable on 9 July 1983 after confirming her heroic virtue. The miracle needed for beatification was investigated from 7 March 1985 until 30 March 1985 and was validated in Rome in 1985. A medical board approved the healing to be a miracle on 25 June 1986 as did theologians on 19 December 1986 and the C.C.S. on 17 March 1987. John Paul II approved it on 8 May 1987 and beatified her in Saint Peter's Square on 1 November 1987.

References

External links
 Santi e Beati (in Italian)
 Hagiography Circle

1883 births
1918 deaths
20th-century German Roman Catholic nuns
20th-century venerated Christians
20th-century deaths from tuberculosis
Beatifications by Pope John Paul II
German beatified people
People from Merzig-Wadern
Ursulines
Venerated Catholics by Pope John Paul II
Women educators
Tuberculosis deaths in Germany